The Federated States of Micronesia national football team is the national team of the Federated States of Micronesia and is controlled by the Federated States of Micronesia Football Association. The team is not a member of FIFA, or a regional confederation, and therefore cannot compete in the World Cup.

Overview
The team has only played a handful of matches, the last in 2003. In 2015, the under-23 team suffered a series of heavy defeats at the Pacific Games, the presence of a side at the tournament was intended to be the first step towards having a more permanent national team with FIFA recognition.

1999 Micronesian Cup
In 1999, Yap hosted the Micronesian Cup. This was a three-team tournament consisting of the Northern Mariana Islands, Micronesia and an international team known as the Crusaders (or Crushers according to other sources). On 12 July 1999, Micronesia competed in their first competitive match as they defeated the Northern Mariana Islands, 7–0. The team won their second group match 4–1 against the Crusaders to qualify for the final. Again, they faced Crusaders and Peter Paul Igesumal scored seven times as Micronesia won 14–1 to win the tournament.

Results history
The Federated States of Micronesia's score is shown first in each case.

Notes

Record by opponent
Up to matches played on 7 July 2003.

Competitive record

South Pacific Games record
1963 to 1995 – Did not enter
2003 – Group stage
2007 to 2019 – Did not enter

Micronesian Cup
1999 – Champions

See also
Federated States of Micronesia national under-23 football team

References

External links
 Interview with coach Stan Foster

 
Micronesia, Federated States of
Micronesia, Federated States of
Oceanian national and official selection-teams not affiliated to FIFA